Isabela de Sagua, also shortened as Isabela and nicknamed La Venecia de Cuba ("The Cuban Venice"), is a Cuban village and consejo popular ("people's council", i.e. hamlet) of the municipality of Sagua la Grande, in Villa Clara Province. In 2011 it had a population of 3,187.

History
The village was founded in 1843 as the port and customs of Sagua and, 5 years later, it was enabled for international import trade. Hurricane Kate (1985) severely damaged the village, which had to be largely rebuilt.

Geography
Located on a peninsula, west of Sagua la Grande River mouth and by a lagoon, Isabela lies by the Atlantic Coast, in front of the Jardines del Rey archipelago. It is surrounded by a marsh, that spans around the peninsula.

It is 11 km from Nueva Isabela, 17 from Sagua, 27 from the Mogotes de Jumagua, 36 from Cifuentes and 66 from Santa Clara.

Transport
Isabela de Sagua has a port on the northwestern shore and a marina in the southwestern one. Its railway station is the northern terminus of the Santa Clara-Sagua-Isabela line and has some tracks serving the port. A provincial road links the village to Sagua la Grande and to the "Circuito Norte" (CN) highway.

See also
Municipalities of Cuba
List of cities in Cuba

References

External links

Sagua la Grande
Populated places in Villa Clara Province
Populated places established in 1843
1843 establishments in North America